Poetry is a 2010 South Korean-French drama film written and directed by Lee Chang-dong. It tells the story of a suburban woman in her 60s who begins to develop an interest in poetry while struggling with Alzheimer's disease and her irresponsible grandson. Yoon Jeong-hee stars in the leading role, which was her first role in a film since 1994. The film was selected for the main competition at the 2010 Cannes Film Festival, where it won the Best Screenplay Award. Other accolades include the Grand Bell Awards for Best Picture and Best Actress, the Blue Dragon Film Awards for Best Actress, the Los Angeles Film Critics Association Award for Best Actress, and the Asia Pacific Screen Award for Achievement in Directing and Best Performance by an Actress.

Plot
The movie opens on a river scene with children playing on the bank. The body of a girl in a school uniform floats by.

Yang Mi-ja (Yoon Jeong-hee), a 66-year-old grandmother, consults a doctor at a hospital who is concerned about her forgetfulness, referring her to a specialist. As she leaves the hospital she sees a woman crazy with grief because her 16-year-old daughter has drowned.

Though Mi-ja lives on government welfare, she has a small job taking care of a well-to-do elderly man who has had a stroke. At home, she cares for her ill-mannered 16-year-old grandson, Jong-wook (Lee David), whose divorced mother lives in Busan. When Mi-ja asks Jong-wook about the girl from his class who drowned, Jong-wook insists that he doesn't know her.

When Mi-ja notices a poster advertising a poetry class at a local community center, she decides to enroll. The course assignment is to write one poem by the end of the month-long course. At the suggestion of her teacher, she begins writing notes about the things she sees, especially flowers.

Jong-wook frequently leaves home at odd hours to socialize with five other boys from school. One night, he invites all of them over without notifying Mi-ja, who nevertheless tries to be a gracious host, offering them a snack before they disappear into Jong-wook's bedroom. Later, one of the boys' fathers insists that Mi-ja join him and the other boys' fathers for a meeting. She is told that the group of boys have repeatedly raped a girl, Agnes, over the past six months, before she jumped off a bridge into a river and drowned. Her diary was discovered, though only four members of the school's faculty are aware of the situation. The fathers fear retribution for their boys, and the school fears a scandal that will tarnish its reputation. In order to avert a full police investigation, the parents of the boys offer to pay a settlement of 30 million won to the widowed mother, a poor farmer. Mi-ja, who cannot afford her 5 million won portion of the payment, is pressured to ask her daughter (Jong-wook's mother) for the money. Though Mi-ja occasionally speaks to her daughter on the phone, she does not mention the situation. When Mi-ja is diagnosed with early stage Alzheimer's disease, she again neglects to tell anyone. She attempts to confront Jong-wook about his actions, but he simply ignores her.

Mi-ja begins attending a local weekly poetry reading. A brash man frequently reads beautiful poetry at these readings, but follows them with crude sexual jokes that offend Mi-ja. Another amateur poet explains to Mi-ja that the man is a policeman with a good heart, and was recently reassigned from Seoul after exposing corruption within its police force.

Mi-ja temporarily quits her job caring for the elderly stroke victim after he makes a desperate sexual advance toward her. She later returns after a journey to the bridge where Agnes jumped, and her hat flies off into the water. She walks down to the riverbank and sits, writing poetry until it begins raining. Dripping wet, she returns to elderly man, agreeing to have sex with him. When she does, she appears emotionless.

In another meeting with the fathers, Mi-ja is elected to travel to the countryside to convince Agnes' mother to accept the settlement. Initially not finding her at home, Mi-ja eventually comes across her working in the field. Mi-ja begins raving about how beautiful the weather, flowers, trees, and fruit are, forgetting about the task at hand. The two have a pleasant exchange before Mi-ja turns and begins to walk away. Finally, she remembers that she was meant to confront the woman about the settlement, but is too embarrassed and continues to leave.

A few days later, Mi-ja returns to the fathers to admit that she still cannot pay her portion of the settlement. Though annoyed that she still hasn't contributed her sum, the fathers are overjoyed that Agnes' mother has agreed to settle, despite Mi-ja's failure to confront her.

Mi-ja asks the elderly man for the money she needs, refusing to tell him what it is for. Wondering if this is Mi-ja's attempt at extortion, he pays her. Once the settlement has been paid to Agnes' mother, Mi-ja phones her daughter to come home, and insists that Jong-wook shower and cut his nails. That night, the crude policeman from the weekly poetry readings appears with his partner to take Jong-wook away. Mi-ja does not protest.

The film concludes with Mi-ja's poetry teacher discovering a bouquet of flowers on the class podium with her poem, "Agnes's Song", but Mi-ja herself is not present. Her daughter returns to an empty home, and calls Mi-ja's phone, but receives no answer. The teacher begins to read Mi-ja's poem to the class. Mi-ja speaks in voiceover, though the voice of Agnes herself takes over midway through, following Agnes from the science lab, where she was raped, to the bus, to the bridge where she is to jump. Agnes turns to the camera, half-smiling, leaving Mi-ja's fate on an ambiguous note.

Cast
 Yoon Jeong-hee as Yang Mi-ja
 Lee David as Park Jong-wook
 Kim Hee-ra as Mr. Kang
 Ahn Nae-sang as Ki-beom's father
 Kim Yong-taek as Kim Yong-taek
 Park Myeong-sin as Hee-jin's mother
 Min Bok-gi as Sun-chang's father
 Kim Hye-jung as Jo Mi-hye
 Kim Hye-jung as Sick Elderly

Production
The idea for the film had its origin in a real-life case where a small town schoolgirl had been raped by a gang of teenage boys. When director Lee Chang-dong heard about the incident, it made an impact on him, although he hadn't been interested in basing a film on the actual events. Later, during a visit in Japan, Lee saw a television program in his hotel room. The program was edited entirely from relaxing shots of nature, "a peaceful river, birds flying, fishermen on the sea – with soft new-age music in the background," and a vision for a possible feature film started to form. "Suddenly, it reminded me of that horrible incident, and the word 'poetry' and the image of a 60-year old woman came up in my mind."

Lee wrote the lead character specifically for Yoon Jeong-hee, a major star of Korean cinema from the 1960s and 1970s. Yoon later expressed satisfaction with how the role differed from what she typically played in the past: "I've always had the desire to show people different aspects of my acting and (Lee) provided me with every opportunity to do just that." Prior to Poetry, the last film Yoon appeared in was Manmubang ("Two Flags") from 1994. Production was led by Pine House Film, founded in 2005 by the director, with co-production support from UniKorea Culture & Art Investment.

Filming started on August 25, 2009 and ended three months later in Gyeonggi Province and Gangwon Province. Lee was initially worried that Yoon's long experience might have bound her to an outdated acting style, but was very pleased with her attitude, saying, "She performed her scenes with a willingness to discuss and this is something that's difficult to find even in younger actors."

Release
On May 13, 2010, N.E.W. released Poetry in 194 South Korean theaters with a gross revenue corresponding to around  during the first weekend. The film sold 220,693 tickets nationwide in South Korea.

The international premiere took place at the 2010 Cannes Film Festival, where Poetry was screened on May 19 as part of the main competition.

The Korean DVD was released on October 23, 2010 and includes English subtitles. The film was distributed theatrically in the United States by Kino International.

Critical response
As of July 1, 2019, the film has a 100% approval rating from critics with 67 reviews on film review aggregation site Rotten Tomatoes, with a weighted average of 8.64/10. The website's critical consensus reads, "Poetry is an absorbing, poignant drama because it offers no easy answers to its complex central conflict." At Metacritic, based on 23 critical reviews, the film had a score of 87 out of 100, categorizing it as having received "universal acclaim." "Given the abundant potential for missteps into sappiness with this sort of premise," Justin Chang wrote in Variety, "what's notable here is the lack of sentimentality in Lee's approach. At no point does Poetry devolve into a terminal-illness melodrama or a tale of intergenerational bonding." Chang continued by noting how Lee's background as a novelist sometimes shows through, and that "[t]here are longueurs here... that could be trimmed, though overall this absorbing film feels considerably shorter than its 139 minutes." It was included in CNN'''s list of top ten best movies of 2011, and Chicago Tribune film critic Michael Phillips named Poetry his favorite film of 2011. In 2020, The Guardian ranked it number 4 among the classics of modern South Korean Cinema.

Accolades
Lee won the Best Screenplay Award at the Cannes Film Festival. At the 47th Grand Bell Awards, Poetry won the prizes for Best Picture, Best Screenplay, Best Actress and Best Supporting Actor. The film received the Korean Association of Film Critics Awards for Best Picture and Best Screenplay. The jury of the 31st Blue Dragon Film Awards decided to exclude Poetry from the selection, since Lee had announced that he would boycott the ceremony. Still, they nominated Yoon for Best Actress as they thought the director's decision should not affect the cast. The award was eventually shared by Yoon and Soo Ae, for her performance in Midnight FM. At the 2010 Asia Pacific Screen Awards, Lee received the award for Best Achievement in Directing and Yoon for Best Performance by an Actress; the film was also nominated in the categories Best Feature Film and Best Screenplay. It was also nominated for the Grand Prix of the Belgian Syndicate of Cinema Critics.

In 2011, Poetry was nominated as Best Film at the 5th Asian Film Awards, where Lee won Best Director and Best Screenplay. It also received the Le Regard d'Or ("Golden Gaze") Grand Prix and FIPRESCI Award at the Fribourg International Film Festival. After France honored Yoon as an Officier dans l'ordre des Arts et Lettres ("Officer of the Order of Arts and Letters), she was named Best Actress at the Cinemanila International Film Festival. Yoon also won the Los Angeles Film Critics Association Award for Best Actress for her performance, marking the second consecutive year a Korean actress won the award after Kim Hye-ja won for Mother'' in 2010.

See also

List of films with a 100% rating on Rotten Tomatoes, a film review aggregator website

References

External links
 Poetry official North American website at Kino International
 
 
 
 
 
 

2010 films
2010 drama films
Best Picture Grand Bell Award winners
Films about Alzheimer's disease
Films about bullying
Films about suicide
Films directed by Lee Chang-dong
2010s Korean-language films
Films about rape
South Korean drama films
French drama films
Films about poetry
Films about poets
2010s South Korean films
2010s French films
Films about disability
Next Entertainment World films